The Breakers is a Gilded Age mansion located at 44 Ochre Point Avenue, Newport, Rhode Island, US. It was built between 1893 and 1895 as a summer residence for Cornelius Vanderbilt II, a member of the wealthy Vanderbilt family.

The Ochre Point Avenue entrance is marked by sculpted iron gates, and the  walkway gates are part of a  limestone-and-iron fence that borders the property on all but the ocean side.

The house was added to the National Register of Historic Places in 1971, and was designated a National Historic Landmark in 1994. It is also a contributing property to the Bellevue Avenue Historic District. The property is owned and operated by the Newport Preservation Society as a museum and is open for visits all year.

History

Cornelius Vanderbilt II purchased the grounds in 1885 for $450,000 ($ million today). The previous mansion on the property was owned by Pierre Lorillard IV; it burned on November 25, 1892, and Vanderbilt commissioned famed architect Richard Morris Hunt to rebuild it in splendor. Vanderbilt insisted that the building be made as fireproof as possible, so the structure of the building used steel trusses and no wooden parts. He even required that the boiler be located away from the house in an underground space below the front lawn.

The designers created an interior using marble imported from Italy and Africa, and rare woods and mosaics from countries around the world. It also included architectural elements purchased from chateaux in France, such as the library mantel. Expansion was finally finished in 1892.

The Breakers is the architectural and social archetype of the "Gilded Age," a period when members of the Vanderbilt family were among the major industrialists of America. It was the largest, most opulent house in the Newport area upon its completion in 1895.

Vanderbilt died from a cerebral hemorrhage caused by a stroke in 1899 at age 55, leaving The Breakers to his wife Alice Gwynne Vanderbilt. She outlived him by 35 years and died at the age of 89 in 1934. She left The Breakers to her youngest daughter Countess Gladys Széchenyi (1886–1965), essentially because Gladys lacked American property; in addition, none of her other children were interested in the property, while Gladys had always loved the estate.

In 1948, Gladys leased the high-maintenance property to The Preservation Society of Newport County for $1 per year. The Preservation Society bought The Breakers and approximately 90% of its furnishings in 1972 for $365,000 ($ million today) from Countess Sylvia Szapary, Gladys's daughter, although the agreement granted her life tenancy. Upon her death in 1998, The Preservation Society agreed to allow the family to continue to live on the third floor, which is not open to the public.

It is now the most-visited attraction in Rhode Island, with approximately 450,000 visitors annually as of 2017.

Gardens
The pea-gravel driveway is lined with maturing pin oaks and red maples. The trees of The Breakers' grounds act as screens that increase the sense of distance between The Breakers and its Newport neighbors. Among the more unusual imported trees are two examples of the Blue Atlas Cedar, a native of North Africa. Clipped hedges of Japanese yew and Pfitzer juniper line the tree-shaded footpaths that meander about the grounds. Informal plantings of arbor vitae, taxus, Chinese juniper, and dwarf hemlock provide attractive foregrounds for the walls that enclose the formally landscaped terrace.

The grounds also contain several varieties of other rare trees, copper and weeping beeches. These were hand-selected by Ernest W. Bowditch, a landscape architect and civil engineer based in the Boston area. Bowditch's original pattern for the south parterre garden was determined from old photographs and laid out in pink and white alyssum and blue ageratum. The wide borders paralleling the wrought iron fence are planted with rhododendrons, mountain laurel, dogwoods, and many other flowering shrubs that effectively screen the grounds from street traffic and give visitors a feeling of seclusion.

Layout

Basement
Laundry
Staff's restrooms

First floor
Entrance foyer
Gentlemen's reception room
Ladies' reception room
Great hall ( ×  × ) – Over each of the six doors that lead from the Great Hall are limestone figure groups celebrating humanity's progress in art, science, and industry: Galileo, representing science; Dante, representing literature; Apollo, representing the arts; Mercury, representing speed and commerce; Richard Morris Hunt, representing architecture; and Karl Bitter, representing sculpture.
Main staircase
Arcade 
Library – The library has coffered ceilings painted with a dolphin, symbolic of the sea and hospitality, supported by Circassian walnut paneling impressed with gold leaf in the form of a leather-bound book. Between the ceiling and the gold paneling lies green Spanish leather embossed with gold, which continues into the library from the alcove where the inhabitants played cards. Inside the central library rest two busts; the bronze bust depicts William Henry Vanderbilt II, the oldest child of Cornelius II and Alice, who died of typhoid at the age of 21 while attending Yale University. There is now a library at Yale dedicated to William Henry Vanderbilt II. The second bust, in marble, is of Cornelius Vanderbilt II. The fireplace, taken from a 16th-century French chateau (Arnay-le-Duc, Burgundy), bears the inscription "I laugh at great wealth, and never miss it; nothing but wisdom matters in the end."
Music room – The room's open interior was used for recitals and dances. Its woodwork and furnishings were designed by Richard Van der Boyen and implemented by Jules Allard and Sons. The room has a gilt coffered ceiling lined with silver and gold, as well as an elliptical ceiling molding which bears the inscription in French of song, music, harmony and melody. Around the edge are the names of well-known composers. The fireplace is of Campan marble and the tables were designed to match. Mr. Vanderbilt was known to play the violin and Mrs. Vanderbilt the piano, which is a Second Empire French mahogany ormolu mounted piano.
Morning room – This room, a communal sitting room facing east to admit the morning sun, was used throughout the day, and was designed by the French company head Jules Allard. Placed around the room are platinum-leafed panels illustrated with 8 of the 9 muses. All interior woodwork and furnishings were designed and constructed in France, then shipped to America before assembly.
Lower loggia
Billiards room – This room, in the style of ancient Rome, was designed by Richard Morris Hunt and shows his competence in stone works. The great slabs of Cippolino marble from Italy form the walls, while rose alabaster arches provide contrast. Throughout the room there is an assortment of semi-precious stones, forming mosaics of acorns (the Vanderbilt family emblem, intended to show strength and longevity) and billiards balls on the top walls. The Renaissance style mahogany furniture provides further contrast with that of the colored marble.
Dining room – The  dining room is the house's grandest room and has 12 freestanding rose alabaster Corinthian columns supporting a colossal carved and gilt cornice. Rich in allegory, this room serves as an exemplar of what 19th-century technology could do with Roman ideas and 18th-century inspiration. On the ceiling, the goddess Aurora is depicted bringing in the dawn on a four-horse chariot as Greek figures pose majestically. A 16th-century style table of carved oak seats up to 34. Two Baccarat crystal chandeliers light the room with either gas or electricity, and 18, 22 or 24 carat gold gilt adheres to the wall through rabbit skin glue.
Breakfast room – The breakfast room, with its modified Louis XV style paneling and furnishings, was used for family morning meals. The furnishings, colors and gilt, although still extravagant in their use, contrast with the dining room's more lavish decoration.
Pantry – A central dumbwaiter serves to bring additional china and glassware down from the mezzanine level. The pantry was also used for the storage of the family's table silver; this was brought with the family when they traveled, and stored in a steel vault. An intercom system allows the butler to direct the necessary servants to their needed locations, and each number on the caller corresponds to a number on a room.
Kitchen – The kitchen, unlike others in the time period, was situated on the first floor away from the main house to prevent the possibility of fires and cooking smells reaching the main parts of the house. The well-ventilated room supports a  cast iron stove, which heats up as a single element through a coal burning stove. The work table is made of zinc, a metal which served as the forerunner to stainless steel; in front of it is a marble mortar used to crush various ingredients. Ice cut from the local ponds kept the side rooms cool where food was stored, and facilitated a colder room for the assembling of confections. The kitchen and baking pantry each have one dumbwaiter that travels to the basement level where groceries were delivered and refuse removed.

Second floor
Mr. Vanderbilt's bedroom – As with the rest of the second floor, Ogden Codman designed this room, choosing Louis XIV Style. The bed is made of carved walnut finish and the mantel is of rouge royal marble, which hosts a large mirror above to bring more light into the room. There lies much memorabilia of family and friends, though Cornelius Vanderbilt II lived only a year at the Breakers in good health, before dying the following year, 1899, of a stroke.
Mrs. Vanderbilt's bedroom – Designed as a perfect oval, Alice Vanderbilt's room accommodates multiple doors, though they are cut into the wall to leave an undisturbed picture of geometric perfection, that connect the bedrooms. Alice had four closets to allow for her possible seven clothing changes per day, and a pager to administer and relegate family needs to the servants. This room also served as her study and had many bookshelves. Additionally, there are discreetly designed corridors that permitted female servants to maintain the laundry and costume needs of the family in a seemingly invisible fashion.
Miss Gertrude Vanderbilt's bedroom – Gertrude, daughter of Cornelius II and Alice, was a less conforming character who wished to be loved for her personality rather than her wealth and family, and later found her match in Harry Payne Whitney, and became an artist. Around the room there lie multiple pieces of her art work, including "The Engineer", which was inspired by her brother during World War I, "Laborer", and another that commemorates the American Expeditionary Force of World War I. She moved into The Breakers when she was 19. Above her bed is a portrait by Raimundo de Madrazo y Garreta of Miss Gertrude Vanderbilt at 5 years old, and beside that, to the left of the bed, is a sketch of her as a young woman.
Upper loggia – Serving as an informal living room, the upper loggia faces east, and opens to the Atlantic. During the summer, when needed, the glass doors overlooking the great hall could be opened to allow a breezeway. The walls are painted marble, and the ceiling is designed to depict three canopies that cover the sky. The lawn, designed by James and Ernest Bowdwitch, hosted many parties and was well kept by a gardening staff of 20, who also introduced and maintained various non-indigenous trees.
Guest bedroom – This room exemplifies the Louis XVI style through furniture, woodwork and light fixtures, with Neoclassical style abounding in the interior. The wall paneling has never been retouched, though the rest of the room has been restored by the preservation society.
Countess Szechenyi's bedroom – Designed by Ogden Codman in 18th-century simple elegance style, this room features an ivory and cream-colored design.
There are also two other rooms located on the second floor, possibly a nursery and a nanny's bedroom.

Third floor
The third floor contains eight bedrooms and a sitting room decorated in Louis XVI style walnut paneling by Ogden Codman. The north wing of the third-floor quarters were reserved for domestic servants. This was because of the configuration of the house, built in Italian Renaissance style, which included a pitched roof. Flat-roofed French classical houses built in the area at the time allowed a concealed wing for staff, whereas the Breakers' design did not permit this feature.

A total of 30 bedrooms are located in the two third-floor staff quarters. Three additional bedrooms for the butler, chef, and visiting valet are located on the mezzanine "entresol" floor, located between the first and second floor just to the rear of the main kitchen.

Attic floor
The attic floor contained more staff quarters, general storage areas, and the innovative cisterns. One smaller cistern supplied hydraulic pressure for the 1895 Otis elevator, still functioning in the house even though the house was wired for electricity in 1933. Two larger cisterns supplied fresh and salt water to the many bathrooms in the house.

Over the grand staircase is a stained glass skylight designed by artist John La Farge. Originally installed in the Vanderbilts' 1 West 57th Street (New York City) townhouse dining room, the skylight was removed in 1894 during an expansion of the house.

Materials
Foundation: brick, concrete, and limestone
Trusses: steel
Walls: Indiana limestone
Roof: red terra cotta tile
Wall panels: platinum leaf (eight reliefs of mythological figures only)
Other: marble (plaques), wrought iron (gates and fences)

The architect
The Breakers is also a definitive expression of Beaux-Arts architecture in American domestic design by one of the country's most influential architects Richard Morris Hunt. The Breakers was Hunt's final project; it is also one of his few surviving works and is valuable for its rarity as well as its architectural excellence. The Breakers made Hunt the "dean of American architecture", as he was called by his contemporaries, and helped define the era in American life that Hunt helped to shape.

New welcome center controversy
A debate developed when The Preservation Society of Newport County made plans to build a new welcome center within the property's garden. The Newport Zoning Board approved the welcome center in January 2015. On January 9, 2017, the Rhode Island Supreme Court ruled that the Newport Zoning Board of Review was the correct body to determine the permissibility of the project. The Welcome Center opened on June 14, 2018.

See also

List of Gilded Age mansions
List of largest houses in the United States
List of National Historic Landmarks in Rhode Island
National Register of Historic Places listings in Newport County, Rhode Island

Footnotes

References

Further reading
Wilson, Richard Guy, Diane Pilgrim, and Richard N. Murray. American Renaissance 1876–1917. New York: The Brooklyn Museum, 1979.
Baker, Paul R. Richard Morris Hunt. Cambridge, Massachusetts: The MIT Press, 1980.
Benway, Ann. A Guidebook to Newport Mansions. Preservation Society of Newport County, 1984.
Croffut, William A. The Vanderbilts and the Story of their Fortune. Chicago and New York: Belford, Clarke and Company, 1886.
Downing, Antoinette F. and Vincent J. Scully, Jr. The Architectural Heritage of Newport, Rhode Island. 2nd edition, New York: Clarkson N. Potter, Inc., 1967.
Ferree, Barr. American Estates and Gardens. New York: Munn and Company, 1904.
Gannon, Thomas. Newport Mansions: the Gilded Age. Fort Church Publishers, Inc., 1982.
Gavan, Terrence. 'The Barons of Newport: A Guide to the Gilded Age'. Newport: Pineapple Publications, 1998. 
Jordy, William H., and Christopher P. Monkhouse. Buildings on Paper. Brown University, Rhode Island Historical Society and Rhode Island School of Design, 1982.
Lints, Eric P. "The Breakers: A Construction and Technologies Report" Newport, RI: The Newport Preservation Society of Newport County, 1992.
Metcalf, Pauline C., ed. Ogden Codman and the Decoration of Houses. Boston: The Boston Athenaeum, 1988.
Patterson, Jerry E. The Vanderbilts. New York: Harry N. Abrams, Inc., 1989.
Perschler, Martin. "Historic Landscapes Project" Newport, RI: The Preservation Society of Newport County, 1993.
Schuyler, Montgomery. "The Works of the Late Richard M. Hunt," The Architectural Record, Vol. V., October–December 1895: p. 180.
Smales, Holbert T. "The Breakers" Newport, Rhode Island. Newport, RI: Remington Ward, 1951.
Thorndike, Joseph J., ed. Three Centuries of Notable American Architects. New York: American Heritage Publishing Co., Inc., 1981.
Mackenzie Stuart, Amanda. Consuelo & Alva; Harper Perennial, London; 2006. .

External links

Preservation Society of Newport County - Breakers Page
Complete details of the building, from the United States Department of the Interior, National Park Service (Adobe PDF file)

Vanderbilt family residences
Houses in Newport, Rhode Island
Historic house museums in Rhode Island
Museums in Newport, Rhode Island
Biographical museums in Rhode Island
Houses completed in 1895
Houses on the National Register of Historic Places in Rhode Island
National Historic Landmarks in Rhode Island
Historic American Buildings Survey in Rhode Island
Richard Morris Hunt buildings
Italianate architecture in Rhode Island
Renaissance Revival architecture in Rhode Island
Gilded Age mansions
National Register of Historic Places in Newport, Rhode Island
Individually listed contributing properties to historic districts on the National Register in Rhode Island